Fabian Marley (born 27 July 1968 in Kingston, Jamaica) is a Jamaican who was best known for his claim that Bob Marley was his father. These claims later proved to be false using DNA analysis. At the age of 12 Fabian and his mother relocated to Eastern Kingston, Jamaica. His first encounter with the music was with the Rainbow Band. While playing with the band he began working with The Skatalites. He garnered his style of music the orthodox way from mentors, Johnny Moore, Roland Alphanso, and other members from the band. After mastering the harmonica he then acquired piano skills and then later learned how to play the guitar.

Musical career
Fabian was part of an upcoming band called Sounds of Rainbow.  While working on their album and single they struggled from a tragic experience that led to the death of some of the band's members.  Left with only Fabian, the lead drummer and the lead guitarist, the survivors of the band were forced to find new members. The result of this tragic experience led Fabian to step up to the plate and become the lead singer of the band.

In effort to continue with his music career, Fabian began recording at All Fruits Studio's, Cave Man Studio's and Afari Studio's. All the mixing and mastering was done at the Marley Estate owned Tuff Gong Recording Studios.  Fabian's vision on his music came with the guidance from powerhouse producers Rohan "Snowcone" Fuller and Clive Hunt.  Fabian's vision is to continue the work that Bob Marley started, and spreading the gospel of reggae music and unity worldwide. He continues to seek guidance from Bunny Wailer who has given him the most advice on his music career.

Discography

References

Further reading
 
 
 
 
 Fabian Marleys France tour write up
 Fabian Marley on Hip Hop Weekly

External links
Slideshow picture article on Bob Marleys 14 Children via GlobalGrind.com (Website ran by Michael Skolnik and Russell Simmons) .
Article on Fabian Marley Via Loopjamaica.com
coverage of Fabian Marleys single "Through The Fire" 
Fabian Marley on World Star Hip Hop
 Live Interview with Bunny Wailer & Fabian Marley
Listiing of Bob Marleys Sons

1968 births
Living people
Jamaican reggae musicians